Coherence, coherency, or coherent may refer to the following:

Physics 

 Coherence (physics), an ideal property of waves that enables stationary (i.e. temporally and spatially constant) interference
 Coherence (units of measurement), a derived unit that, for a given system of quantities and for a chosen set of base units, is a product of powers of base units with no other proportionality factor than one
 Coherence time, the time over which a propagating wave (especially a laser or maser beam) may be considered coherent; the time interval within which its phase is, on average, predictable

Mathematics 

 Coherence (philosophical gambling strategy), a concept in Bayesian statistics
 Coherence (signal processing), a statistic that can be used to examine the relation between two signals or data sets
 Coherence (statistics), a property of self-consistency across a set of assessments, or  the strength of association between two series
 Coherence condition in category theory, a collection of conditions requiring that various compositions of elementary morphisms are equal
 Coherency (homotopy theory) in homotopy theory and (higher) category theory
 Coherent sampling, a relationship used in Fast Fourier transforms
 Coherent set of characters in representation theory, a property of sets of characters that allows one to extend an isometry from the degree-zero subspace of a space of characters to the whole space
 Coherent sheaf, a specific class of sheaves having particularly manageable properties closely linked to the geometrical properties of the underlying space
 Mutual coherence (linear algebra), sometimes referred to as coherence,  the maximum absolute value of the cross-correlations between the columns of a matrix
 Multi-spectral phase coherence, a generalized nonlinear cross-frequency phase coupling metric introduced by Yang et al., 2016
Coherence (fairness), a consistency requirement of fair division rules.

Philosophy 

 Coherentism, philosophical theories in modern epistemology, the study of knowledge
 Coherence theory of truth, a theory which regards truth as coherence within some specified set of sentences, propositions or beliefs

Computer science 
 Coherence (programming language), an experimental programming language based upon Subtext
 Cache coherence, a special case of memory coherence
 Memory coherence, a concept in computer architecture
 In scrum and agile methodologies, coherence is defined as a measure of the relationships between backlog items which make them worthy of consideration as a whole.

IT products 
 Coherence (software), a component of Parallels Desktop for Mac, the Windows virtualization software
 Coherent (operating system), a UNIX-clone operating system
 Oracle Coherence, an in-memory data grid product from Oracle

Other uses 

 Coherence (cognitive science), a property of mental/cognitive states
 Coherence (linguistics), what makes a text semantically meaningful
 Coherence (music theory), a synonym for strict Rothenberg propriety in diatonic set theory
 Coherent optical module, a hot-pluggable optical transceiver implementing a coherent modulation algorithm
 Coherence time (communications systems), duration when a communication channel can be assumed to be constant
 Coherent, Inc., a company specializing in equipment to make and measure coherent light (lasers)
 Coherent risk measure in  financial economics, a function that satisfies properties of monotonicity, sub-additivity, homogeneity, and translational invariance
 Coherence (film), a 2013 science fiction film by James Ward Byrkit
 Sense of coherence, a construct in the health theory salutogenesis

See also 

 Cohesion (disambiguation)
 Mutual coherence (disambiguation)